The 1892 United States presidential election in Montana took place on November 8, 1892, as part of the 1892 United States presidential election. Voters chose three representatives, or electors to the Electoral College, who voted for president and vice president.

Montana participated in its first ever presidential election, having become the 41st state on November 8, 1889. The state voted for the Republican nominee, incumbent President Benjamin Harrison, over the Democratic nominee, former President Grover Cleveland, who was running for a second, non-consecutive term and over the People's Party (Populists) nominee James B. Weaver. Harrison won Montana by a narrow margin of 2.65%.

Cleveland is the only Democrat to win the White House without carrying Silver Bow County.

Results

Results by county

See also
 United States presidential elections in Montana

Notes

References

Montana
1892
1892 Montana elections